"Seasons in the Sun" is an English-language adaptation of the 1961 Belgian song "Le Moribond" ("The Dying Man") by  singer-songwriter Jacques Brel with lyrics rewritten in 1963 by American singer-poet Rod McKuen, portraying a dying man's farewell to his loved ones. It became a worldwide hit in 1974 for Canadian singer Terry Jacks and became a Christmas number one in the UK in 1999 for Westlife.

Background and lyrics 

The first version of the song was recorded by Brel, who reportedly wrote it in a brothel in Tangiers. Sung in a marching tempo, it tells of a man dying of a broken heart and shows him saying his last farewells to his close friend and priest Emile, an acquaintance named Antoine, and his wife Francoise, who has cheated on him numerous times with Antoine. Despite knowing of Antoine being his wife's lover, he wishes no ill upon him but tells him to take care of his wife. American Rod McKuen translated the lyrics into English. In 1964, the Kingston Trio first recorded an English version of "Seasons in the Sun", which was later heard by Terry Jacks and became the basis for his rendition.

Jacks rewrote the lyrics, although he is uncredited for it. He justifies the rewriting by stating that he deemed the original version and its translations as "too macabre". The inspiration for the rewritten lyrics was a close friend of his who was suffering from acute leukemia and died four months later. The Terry Jacks rendition, which was later dedicated to the friend, has the dying man giving his last words to his loved ones with whom he shared his life, much like the original. However, unlike the Brel version, the man does not die broken-hearted but instead, acknowledges the rights and wrongs of his actions in life as he passes away peacefully. 

In the rewritten version, the man first addresses a close friend whom he had known since childhood and reminisces about the happy times they had, such as playing and studying together ("climbed hills and trees", "learned of love and ABC's") and friendships with others ("skinned our hearts and skinned our knees"). He then addresses his father, who tried to give him a good upbringing and exert a positive influence on his undisciplined life ("I was the black sheep of the family", "You tried to teach me right from wrong", "wonder how I got along") which included overindulgence, vices, and revelry ("too much wine and too much song"). The man finally addresses a "Michelle", recounting how she had lifted his spirit up in times of despair. At the end of each verse, the man reminds all three that he is always present in spirit when they visit places or see people.

Recording
According to Jacks, the Beach Boys asked him to be their producer during the sessions for the band's album Surf's Up. On July 31, 1970 they attempted a rendition of the "Seasons in the Sun", but the session went badly, and the track was never finished. Afterwards, Mike Love told an interviewer: "We did record a version [of 'Seasons'] but it was so wimpy we had to throw it out. ... It was just the wrong song for us." The recording remained unreleased until the 2021 compilation Feel Flows.

Jacks recorded his rendition in Vancouver in 1973. The piano arpeggio parts and double bass parts in the second verse were done by a young David Foster.

Release
Jacks released his version as a single in 1973 on his own label, Goldfish Records. "Put the Bone In", an original composition about burying a deceased pet dog, was included as the B-side. The single soon topped the record charts in the US (where it was released on Bell Records), in Canada, and the UK, selling over 14 million copies worldwide.

Jacks's version was released in the United States in December 1973 and made the Billboard Hot 100 a month later. On March 2, 1974, the song began a three-week run at number one atop the Hot 100 and remained in the top 40 until almost Memorial Day weekend. Jacks's version also spent one week on the Easy Listening charts. Billboard ranked it as the number two song for 1974. Although he released several other singles that were moderately successful in Canada, "Seasons in the Sun" would become Jacks's only major solo hit in the United States. In Canada, the single (Gold Fish GF 100) reached number one on the RPM magazine charts January 26, 1974, and remained there four weeks.

Though the song enjoyed contemporary success, some modern critics take a dimmer view, considering it overly sentimentalized. Jacks's version has been held up as an example of bad music, such as having been listed as one of the worst pop songs ever recorded and ranking number five in a similar CNN poll in 2006.

Jacks also released a German-language version in Germany with lyrics by Gerd Müller-Schwanke, "In den Gärten der Zeit".

Other versions
The first recording of the English-language version (lyrics by McKuen) was released on 1963 album Time to Think by The Kingston Trio.
The Fortunes recorded the song for a 1968 single.
The Newmen, an Irish vocal group, released a version in 1969 on Dolphin Records (DOS37) with 'Bonnie Bonnie' on the B-side.
Colombian duet Ana y Jaime released a Spanish version called Estaciones en el Sol.
Pearls Before Swine included a version of the song on their album City of Gold in 1971, with lyrics reflecting the darkness of Brel's original version.
A cover version by Bobby Wright reached #24 of the Billboard magazine Hot Country Singles chart in 1974.
Hong Kong English pop and Cantopop band The Wynners cover version in 1974 album Listen to the Wynners and Alan Tam as the vocal.
Klaus Hoffmann recorded a German version of "Le Moribond", titled "Adieu Emile", in 1975.
Too Much Joy recorded the song for their 1988 album Son Of Sam I Am, and it became a regular part of their live shows.
Nirvana also recorded the song in 1993, which was released in the box set With the Lights Out in 2004.
 Damir released a version of the song in 1993
Westlife made their cover version in 1999 and included it on their album Westlife.
Nana Mouskouri did a version of the song.
Black Box Recorder included their cover as the first track on their B-sides compilation album The Worst Of Black Box Recorder.
Spell (an ensemble composed of Boyd Rice and Rose McDowall) recorded a version in 1993, and titled their only album after the song.
Alcazar covered the song in 2000.
Jim Bob released a version in 2021.

Charts

Weekly charts

Year-end charts

All-time charts

See also
 List of 1970s one-hit wonders in the United States

References

External links

 Seasons in the Sun at Super Seventies.
 "List of 'Le Moribond' covers", Brelitude.net
 "Goodbye, Papa, It's Hard to Die: The enduring appeal of an abominable pop song" (Slate.com, March 16, 2005)

1961 songs
1973 singles
1974 singles
1999 singles
2000 singles
Christmas number-one singles in the United Kingdom
Songs written by Jacques Brel
Songs written by Rod McKuen
Jacques Brel songs
The Kingston Trio songs
Vikingarna (band) songs
Westlife songs
Nirvana (band) songs
Canadian pop songs
Bobby Wright songs
Andy Williams songs
Billboard Hot 100 number-one singles
Cashbox number-one singles
Number-one singles in Australia
Number-one singles in Finland
Number-one singles in Germany
Irish Singles Chart number-one singles
Number-one singles in New Zealand
Number-one singles in Norway
RPM Top Singles number-one singles
Number-one singles in Scotland
Number-one singles in Switzerland
UK Singles Chart number-one singles
Bell Records singles
Philips Records singles
Pop ballads
Juno Award for Single of the Year singles
Songs about death
Songs about parting